Concord Township is a township in Hardin County, Iowa, USA.

History
Concord Township was organized in 1872.

References

Townships in Hardin County, Iowa
Townships in Iowa
1872 establishments in Iowa